Nannambra  is a census town in Malappuram district in the state of Kerala, India.

Demographics
 India census, Nannambra had a population of 35532 with 16846 males and 18686 females.

Transportation
The nearest airport is at Kozhikode.  The nearest major railway station is at Parappanangadi.

References

Cities and towns in Malappuram district
Parappanangadi area